In mathematics, a planar lamina (or plane lamina) is a figure representing a thin, usually uniform, flat layer of the solid. It serves also as an idealized model of a planar cross section of a solid body in integration.

Planar laminas can be used to determine moments of inertia, or center of mass of flat figures, as well as an aid in corresponding calculations for 3D bodies.

Definition

Basically, a planar lamina is defined as a figure (a closed set)  of a finite area in a plane, with some mass .

This is useful in calculating moments of inertia or center of mass for a constant density, because the mass of a lamina is proportional to its area.

Properties
The center of mass of the lamina is at the point

with summation and integration taken over a planar domain .

Example

The inner integral is:

Plugging this into the outer integral results in:

Similarly are calculated both moments:

with the inner integral:

which makes:

and

Finally, the center of mass is

References

Measure theory